Arnett Blows For 1300 is an album by the American jazz saxophonist Arnett Cobb, compiling recordings from 1947 originally released on Apollo Records, that was released by the Delmark label in 1995.

Reception

Allmusic reviewer Scott Yanow stated "The spirited tenor (who straddled the boundaries between swing and early R&B) is in prime early form with his sextet on a variety of basic material, much of it blues-oriented. ... This very accessible music is both danceable and full of exciting performances that were formerly rare".

Track listing
All compositions by Arnett Cobb except where noted
 "Arnett Blows for 1300" – 2:49
 "Go Red Go" – 2:40
 "Walkin' with Sid" – 3:05
 "Dutch Kitchen Bounce" – 3:14
 "Running with Ray" – 3:02
 "Big League Blues" (Arnett Cobb, Milt Larkin) – 2:43
 "Cobb's Idea" – 3:09
 "When I Grow Too Old to Dream" (Sigmund Romberg, Oscar Hammerstein II) – 5:31
 "Pay It No Mind" – 3:00
 "Cobb's Boogie" (Cobb, Cootie Williams) – 2:48
 "Flower Garden Blues" (Cobb, O. Shaw) – 3:08
 "Cobb's Corner" – 2:43
 "Top Flight" – 2:56
 "Chick She Ain't Nowhere" (Cobb, Larkin) – 3:01
 "Still Flying" – 2:35

Personnel
Arnett Cobb – tenor saxophone
Dave Page – trumpet
Al King (tracks 3, 7, 13 & 15), Booty Wood (tracks 1, 2, 4-6, 8-11 & 14) – trombone
George Rhodes – piano
Walter Buchanan – bass
George Jones – drums
Milt Larkin – vocals (tracks 6, 11 & 14)

References

1994 compilation albums
Arnett Cobb albums
Delmark Records  albums
Albums produced by Bob Koester